No Pain for Cakes is an album by the American jazz band the Lounge Lizards, released in 1987. John Lurie sang on the album. Marc Ribot contributed to No Pain for Cakes.

Track listing
All tracks composed by John Lurie; except where indicated
 "My Trip to Ireland"
 "No Pain for Cakes"
 "My Clown's on Fire" (John Lurie, Curtis Fowlkes, Marc Ribot)
 "Carry Me Out"
 "Bob and Nico"
 "Tango #3, Determination for Rosa Parks" (Evan Lurie)
 "The Magic of Palermo" (John Lurie, Evan Lurie)
 "Cue for Passion" (Evan Lurie)
 "Where Were You" (Evan Lurie, Erik Sanko)

Personnel

Lounge Lizards
Evan Lurie - piano; voice on "My Trip to Ireland"
John Lurie - alto saxophone, painting
Marc Ribot - guitar, banjo; cornet on "Carry Me Out"
Curtis Fowlkes - trombone
Roy Nathanson - reeds
Erik Sanko - bass
Dougie Bowne - drums
E.J. Rodriguez - percussion

Additional personnel
Anders Gårdmand - baritone saxophone on "No Pain for Cakes" and "Carry Me Out"
Jill Jaffe - violin on "No Pain for Cakes"
Seigen Ono at the Kaufman Astoria Studios, Queens - recording and mixing
Valerie Goodman - coordinator 
Ted Jensen at Sterling Sound, NYC - mastering

References

1987 albums
Antilles Records albums
The Lounge Lizards albums